The 31st Chicago Film Critics Association Awards were announced on December 8, 2018. The awards honor the best in film for 2018. The nominations were announced on December 7. Roma received the most nominations (9), followed by The Favourite (7) and A Star Is Born (7).

Winners and nominees
The winners and nominees for the 31st Chicago Film Critics Association Awards are as follows:

Awards

Awards breakdown
The following films received multiple nominations:

The following films received multiple wins:

References

External links
 

 2018
2018 film awards